Carlos Grätzer is an Argentine composer born in Buenos Aires, Argentina, in 1956.

He was given his musical training by his father,  (a student of Paul Hindemith).

He has divided his artistic work between music and cinema, making animated films, which became awarded films.

In 1984, he was given a scholarship by the French government, come to Paris and settle down. He has taken trainings courses at CNSMD of Paris, Darmstadt, IRCAM, Wellesley College (USA)…

Prizewinner at Alea III (Boston), Bourges, World Music Days 2000 and the International Rostrum of Composers at UNESCO . Grätzer’s music is performed by majors orchestras like Orchestre Philharmonique de Radio France, Orchestre National de France, Ensemble Intercontemporain, etc.

Carlos Grätzer has collaborated with the Ensemble Sillages in projects of music to be played with silent movies by Buster Keaton and John Emerson, commission of the French ministry of culture, it was premiered at the Brest European Short Film Festival (France), and “Georges Méliès, the magician of cinema”, commission of Geneva City.

References

External links 
 Official site
 

1956 births
Living people
Argentine classical composers
20th-century classical composers
21st-century classical composers